Kasar Amboli is a village in Mulshi taluka of Pune District in the state of Maharashtra, India. The Village is located on Pune to Mulashi Road. Nearest railway stations around the village are  Vadgaon railway station, Begdewadi railway station, Lonavala railway station, Talegaon railway station and Kamshet railway station.

References

External links
 Villages in Mulshi taluka 
  Villages in pune maharashtra

Villages in Mulshi taluka